Armageddon Convention has been running for 20 years in New Zealand (as of 2015). It is a new Zealand owned and operated business. the organizers wanted to expand the event and offer fans a more inclusive event experience. So, the next logical step was offering evening events and events outside of the traditional Armageddon experience.

17 to 19 July 2015
Wellington, New Zealand - Armageddon Convention expanded the traditional event by creating a citywide festival. 
The inaugural event was NZ Comic Con - it not only held a traditional Armageddon expo running for three full days but incorporated these additional elements throughout the weekend and evenings.  
 three-day scavenger hunt
 pub crawls 
 quiz nights
 art exhibitions 
 house of horrors
 cosplay photo shoots
 opening party 
 closing party
The event was very successful and provided for a full 96 hours of almost non-stop entertainment.

3 to 6 June 2016
Four days of activities and events to experience Geekdom in the capital Wellington, New Zealand. The NZ comic con festival returned with a three-day scavenger hunt; pub quiz night, art exhibitions. Cosplay photo shoots, House of horrors. Two-night parties, art master class, and Studio Ghibli screenings.

Alongside Wellycon, Au Contraire, and Wellington Zinefest.

It was a busy fun filled long weekend

References

Defunct comics conventions
Defunct science fiction conventions
Comic con